Lietbertus (Letbert, Lambert) of St. Ruf was the abbot of Saint-Ruf, in the diocese of Avignon from 1100 to 1110.

Letbert was the author of a commentary on the Psalms called Flores Psalmorum. He also wrote the customs for or of St Ruf (the Liber ecclesiastici et canonici ordinis). These customs were based upon the monastic recommendations of St. Augustine, and were a great influence on other houses of regular canons which would become the Augustinian Order.

Letbert was educated at the Lille collegiate church of St. Peter, which was dedicated in 1066 - hence his other cognomen, Letbert of Lille.

Notes

Further reading
Ursula Vones-Liebenstein, The Liber ecclesiastici et canonici ordinis of Lietbert of Saint-Ruf

Ursula Vones-Liebenstein, The Customaries of Saint-Ruf

External links
Catholic Encyclopaedia

Medieval French writers
French abbots
French male writers